Aşağı Seyidlər (also, Seyidlər, Seidlyar, and Sendlyar) is a village and municipality in the Zardab Rayon of Azerbaijan.  It has a population of 748.

References 

Populated places in Zardab District